Cyclocypris is a genus of ostracods in the family Candonidae. The genus has a cosmopolitan distribution.

Taxonomy
The following species are recognised in the genus Cyclocypris:
 †Cyclocypris eaglespringsensis Swain, 1964 
 Cyclocypris globosa (Sars, 1863)
 Cyclocypris ovum (Jurine, 1820)
 †Cyclocypris trapezoidalis Swain, 1964

References

Candonidae